Shahid Gomnam Expressway is in central Tehran. It connects Jalal-e-Ale Ahmad Expressway to Fatemi Square.

Expressways in Tehran